CBS 47 may refer to one of the following television stations in the United States:

Current
KGPE, Fresno, California
WJAX-TV, Jacksonville, Florida

Former
WIYE-LD, Parkersburg, West Virginia (2012 to 2020)